Hardin B. Cloud (May 5, 1850 – April 11, 1901) was an American farmer, merchant, and businessman.

Born in Girard, Illinois, Cloud moved to Iowa in 1870. Cloud was a farmer and livestock dealer. He also was a merchant and postmaster for the community of Cloud, Iowa. From 1884 to 1886, Cloud served in the Iowa House of Representatives on the Greenback-Democrat ticket. Cloud died suddenly while staying in a hotel in Chariton, Iowa; he had been in ill-health.

Notes

1850 births
1901 deaths
People from Marion County, Iowa
People from Girard, Illinois
Businesspeople from Iowa
Farmers from Iowa
Iowa Democrats
Iowa Greenbacks
Members of the Iowa House of Representatives
Iowa postmasters